Horsedrawn Wishes is the second and final studio album by the Irish indie rock band Rollerskate Skinny, released on 26 February 1996 on Warner Bros. Records. It was recorded at STS Studios in Dublin, Ireland, mixed at Parr Street Studios in Liverpool, United Kingdom and mastered at Metropolis Studios in London. "Speed to My Side" was released as a single in 1996. The album artwork was designed by noted Dublin designer Andy McCormack with a striking design that stood alone as a great art piece and only cemented the relationship between the music and the striking imagery.

Reception

Since its original release, Horsedrawn Wishes has received positive critical acclaim. Allmusic rated the album four and a half out of five stars with reviewer Tim DiGravina summarising it as "an amazing 60 minutes of music that sounds like a stunning, warped genre onto itself." DiGravina drew comparisons between Horsedrawn Wishes and My Bloody Valentine's Loveless (1991), said that Horsedrawn Wishes "creates elegant sounds, masters walls of guitars (and walls of other instruments as well), and arranges its songs so the hooks have maximum impact" and referred to it is "one of the most original albums in rock and one of the best albums of the 1990s." Hot Press noted that the album "sounded like Ireland's answer to Mercury Rev and The Flaming Lips. Each track was a mini-symphony blending buzzing guitars, unusual harmonies, urgent keyboards and warped melodies" and called it "one of the most innovative sixty minutes of Irish rock music ever recorded." Magnet called Horsedrawn Wishes a "lost classic" and said it "contained meticulously constructed, extraordinarily druggy to-and-fro, with guitars of every shape and size poking through every available surface, its pacing a testament to a lysergic imagination."

Horsedrawn Wishes was listed at number 33 on Hot Press "100 Greatest Irish Albums" list, where it had been previously listed at number 14 in 2004. The album was featured as one of the "Top 50 Irish Albums" in a poll conducted by Irish radio DJ Tom Dunne in December 2001.

"Speed To My Side" will be featured in the film Wild. The whole back catalog of Rollerskate Skinny including Horse Drawn Wishes and previously unreleased material along with Kid Silver, Favourite Sons and August Wells will be released next year on Captcha Records.

Track listing

Personnel
All personnel credits adapted from Horsedrawn Wishess liner notes.

Rollerskate Skinny
Ken Griffin – vocals, guitar, keyboards, orchestration
Ger Griffin – guitar, keyboards, drum programming, orchestration
Stephen Murray – bass, guitar, keyboards, orchestration

Guest musicians
Clive Carroll – drums (2–10)
Conor Murray – drums (1, 11, 12)
Paul Cantwell – drums (9)

Technical personnel
Rollerskate Skinny – production, mixing (1–4, 6, 8–10)
Aidan Foley – production, engineering, mixing (5, 7, 11, 12)
Anjali Dutt – mixing (1–4, 6, 8–10)
Tony Cousins – mastering

Design personnel
Power House Commercial Designs Dublin – design, photography
Art Director: Andy McCormack from Power House (later Imagine Design) Dublin/Berlin based art director.
Eamonn McLoughlin – front cover photography
Andrew Flynn – back cover photography

References

External links

1996 albums
Rollerskate Skinny albums
Warner Records albums